Bevis (sometimes spelled Beavis or Bevys) is a given name of Old French origin, meaning someone coming from Beauvais, in the Oise region, or after the Norman French “belfils” or “beufitz”, meaning fair or lovely son. It was not recorded in England until after the Norman Conquest in 1066.

People 

 Andrew Bevis, an Australian actor
 Arch Bevis (1955–), Australian politician
 Bevis Hillier (1940–), art historian and biographer of Sir John Betjeman
 Bevis Longstreth, novelist and former Commissioner of the United States Securities and Exchange Commission
 Billy Bevis (1918–1994), British football player
 Fred Beavis, 57th mayor of Toronto
 Howard Landis Bevis (1885–1968), president of Ohio State University
 John Bevis (c.1664–1771), English astronomer, known for discovering the Crab Nebula
 Leslie Bevis (1954–), American actress
 Marie-Louise Bévis (1972–), French athlete
 Bevis Mugabi (born 1995), footballer
 Muriel Bevis, American baseball player
 PJ Bevis (1980–), professional baseball player
 A set of English professional wrestling siblings:
 Roy Bevis (born 1982), best known as Zebra Kid and also known as Roy Knight; half-brother of the next two listed individuals
 Zak Zodiac (born 1990), real name Zak Bevis, also known as Zak Knight
 Paige (wrestler) (born 1992), real name Saraya-Jade Bevis, also known as Britani Knight

Media and literature 
 Bevis of Hampton, a character appearing in medieval romance
 "Beves of Hamtoun" (poem), medieval English metrical romance about Bevis of Hampton
 Bevis (book), a boy's adventure story (1882) by Richard Jefferies
 "Mr. Bevis", an episode of The Twilight Zone
 The Bevis Frond, an indie band from London, England
 Beavis, a character from MTV's Beavis and Butt-head
 Sir Bevis, from the Red Book of Romance, edited by Andrew Lang

Places 

 Bevis, Ohio, a community in the United States
 Bevis Marks, a street in the City of London
 Bevis Marks Synagogue, the oldest functioning synagogue in the United Kingdom, situated in a courtyard off the above street

Other 

 HMS Sir Bevis, original name of a Royal Navy 24-class sloop; later renamed HMS Eaglet
 Sir Bevys, a British thoroughbred racehorse, winner of the 1879 Epsom Derby
 Bevis (ship), a sailing vessel carrying passengers from England to the British colonies in America between 1635 and 1638